Walter Bäni (born 17 February 1957) is a Swiss former cyclist. He competed in the 1000m time trial event at the 1976 Summer Olympics.

References

External links
 

1957 births
Living people
Swiss male cyclists
Olympic cyclists of Switzerland
Cyclists at the 1976 Summer Olympics
Place of birth missing (living people)